Club de Fútbol Unión Viera is a Spanish football team based in Las Palmas, in the autonomous community of Canary Islands. Founded in 1962, it plays in Tercera División RFEF – Group 12, holding home matches at Estadio Pepe Gonçalvez.

History 
In the 2017–18 season, the club finished 2nd in the Regional Preferente Canarias Division, Group 1 and promoted to the Tercera División.

On November 6, 2021, the club roped in Atharv Dandekar, first Indian recruit.

Season to season

7 seasons in Tercera División
1 season in Tercera División RFEF

Women's team
Despite achieving promotion on 19 April 2019 to Primera División B, the newly-formed second tier, two months later, the Royal Spanish Football Federation disallowed their promotion to the second tier.

Season to season

References

External links
Official website 
La Preferente team profile 
Soccerway team profile

Football clubs in the Canary Islands
Sport in Las Palmas
Association football clubs established in 1962
1962 establishments in Spain